The FIM Tobet Speedway World Cup Final was the fourth meeting of the 2009 Speedway World Cup tournament. It took place on 19 July 2009 in the Alfred Smoczyk Stadium in Leszno, Poland.

Results

Heat details

See also 
 2009 Speedway World Cup
 motorcycle speedway

References 

!
Speedway
2009 in Polish speedway